Subgraph OS is a Linux distribution designed to be resistant to surveillance and interference by sophisticated adversaries over the Internet. It is based on Debian. The operating system has been mentioned by Edward Snowden as showing future potential.

Subgraph OS is designed to be locked down and with features which aim to reduce the attack surface of the operating system, and increase the difficulty required to carry out certain classes of attack. This is accomplished through system hardening and a proactive, ongoing focus on security and attack resistance. Subgraph OS also places emphasis on ensuring the integrity of installed software packages through deterministic compilation.

Features
Some of Subgraph OS's notable features include:
 Linux kernel hardened with the grsecurity and PaX patchset.
 Linux namespaces and xpra for application containment.
 Mandatory file system encryption during installation, using LUKS.
 Resistance to cold boot attacks.
 Configurable firewall rules to automatically ensure that network connections for installed applications are made using the Tor anonymity network. Default settings ensure that each application's communication is transmitted via an independent circuit on the network.
 GNOME Shell integration for the OZ virtualization client, which runs apps inside a secure Linux container, targeting ease-of-use by everyday users.

Security
The security of Subgraph OS (which uses sandbox containers) has been questioned in comparison to Qubes (which uses virtualization), another security focused operating system. An attacker can trick a Subgraph user to run a malicious unsandboxed script via the OS's default Nautilus file manager or in the terminal. It is also possible to run malicious code containing .desktop files (which are used to launch applications). Malware can also bypass Subgraph OS's application firewall. Also, by design, Subgraph does not isolate the network stack like Qubes OS.

See also
 Tails (operating system)
 Qubes OS

References

External links
 
 

Debian-based distributions
Operating system security
Linux distributions